O Mimi San is a 1914 American short silent drama film directed by Charles Miller, featuring Tsuru Aoki in the title role and Sessue Hayakawa, Kisaburo Kurihara, Chick Morrison and George Osborne in pivotal roles. It was preserved in 1995.

References

External links 
 

1914 films
1914 drama films
1914 short films
American drama short films
American black-and-white films
Films directed by Charles Miller
American silent short films
1910s American films
Silent American drama films
1910s English-language films
English-language drama films